Brest Millennium Monument (2009) - was designed by the Belarusian architect Alexei Andreyuk and sculptor Alexei Pavluchuk to commemorate the millennium of Brest, Belarus. It was erected in 2009 at the intersection of Sovietskaya Street and Gogol Street in Brest. The project was financed by the state budget and public donations.

The monument presents a group of bronze statues. The angel of mercy with a cross is standing at the top of a granite column. 3 statues remember the remarkable historic personalities that are associated with Brest:
Vladimir Vasilkovich, who put up a tower in the castle of the town in the 13th century,
Vytautas the grand duke of Grand Duchy of Lithuania,
Mikołaj "the Black" Radziwiłł in whose printing shop the first Belarusian book was printed,
3 more statues represent abstract images: warrior, mother, chronicler (who wrote apparently the Primary Chronicle).
The total height is 15.1 m,
the height of the angel is 3.8 m,
the height of the 6 statues is 3m.
the diameter of the base is 8.6 m.
In April 2011 a belt of high reliefs appeared around the monument. It depicts history-making episodes of Brest.

References

External links
an article in Russian in "Vecherniy Brest" about assembling the monument
a picture of the monument
an article in Russian in "Brestkaya gazeta" about the unveiling of the monument
an article in Russian about the scenes of the high reliefs, "Vecherniy Brest" of 06.04.2011
detailed information about the monument in Russian, "Vecherniy Brest" #60, July 31, 2009]

2009 sculptures
Monuments and memorials in Belarus
Buildings and structures in Brest, Belarus
Bronze sculptures in Belarus
Tourist attractions in Brest Region